Freman may refer to:

Freman Hendrix, American politician
Freman River, river in Romania
Freman College, school in Hertfordshire, England

See also
Freeman (disambiguation)
Fremen, fictional people in the Dune franchise